Rankin Inlet South/Whale Cove was a territorial electoral district (riding) for the Legislative Assembly of Nunavut, Canada.

The riding consisted of the communities of Rankin Inlet and Whale Cove.

In 2013, the riding was redistributed into Rankin Inlet South and Arviat North-Whale Cove.

Election results

1999 election

2004 election

2008 election

References

External links
Website of the Legislative Assembly of Nunavut

Electoral districts of Kivalliq Region
1999 establishments in Nunavut
2013 disestablishments in Nunavut